Anto or Antos may refer to:

 Anto (name), including a list of people with the surname or given name
 Antos (name), including a list of people with the surname or given name
 Antofagasta PLC, stock symbol ANTO
 Antăș (Hungarian: Antos), a village in Romania

See also

Anth (disambiguation)